James O'Connell (October 11, 1882 – July 10, 1942) was an American athlete. He competed in the men's long jump at the 1908 Summer Olympics.

References

1882 births
1942 deaths
Athletes (track and field) at the 1908 Summer Olympics
American male long jumpers
Olympic track and field athletes of the United States
Place of birth missing